Well stimulation is a well intervention performed on an oil or gas well to increase production by improving the flow of hydrocarbons from the reservoir into the well bore. It may be done using a well stimulator structure or using off shore ships / drilling vessels, also known as "Well stimulation vessels".

Cleaning the formation
The assortment of drilling fluid pumped down the well during drilling and completion can often cause damage to the surrounding formation by entering the reservoir rock and blocking the pore throats (the channels in the rock throughout which the reservoir fluids flow).  Similarly, the act of perforating can have a similar effect by jetting debris into the perforation channels.  Both these situations reduce the permeability in the near well bore area and so reduce the flow of fluids into the well bore.

A simple and safe solution is to pump diluted acid mixtures from surface into the well to dissolve the offending material.  Once dissolved, permeability should be restored and the reservoir fluids will flow into the well bore, cleaning up what is left of the damaging material.  After initial completion, it is common to use minimal amounts of formic acid to clean up any mud and skin damage.  In this situation, the process is loosely referred to as "well stimulation." Oftentimes, groups that oppose oil and gas production refer to the process as "acidization," which is actually the use of acids in high volume and high pressure to stimulate oil production.

In more serious cases, pumping from surface is insufficient as it does not target any particular location downhole and reduces the chances of the chemical retaining its effectiveness when it gets there.  In these cases, it is necessary to spot the chemical directly at its target through the use of coiled tubing.  Coiled tubing is run in hole with a jetting tool on the end.  When the tool is at its target, the chemical is pumping through the pipe and is jetted directly onto the damaged area.  This can be more effective than pumping from surface, though it is much more expensive, and accuracy is dependent on knowing the location of the damage.

Extending the perforation tunnels and fractures
In cased hole completions, perforations are intended to create a hole through the steel casing so that the reservoir can be produced. The holes are typically formed by shaped explosives that perforate the casing and create a fractured hole into the reservoir rock for a short distance.   In many cases, the tunnels created by the perforation guns do not provide enough surface area and it becomes desirable to create more area in contact with the wellbore.

In some cases, more area is needed if the reservoir is of low permeability. In other cases, damage caused by drilling and completion operations can be severe enough that the perforation tunnel does not effectively penetrate through the damaged volume near the bore.  This means that the ability of fluids to flow into the existing perforation tunnels is too limited.  One method to achieve more stimulation is by carrying out a hydraulic fracture treatment through the perforations.

If permeability is naturally low, then as fluid is drained from the immediate area, replacement fluid may not flow into the void sufficiently quickly to make up for the voidage and so the pressure drops.  The well cannot then flow at a rate sufficient to make production economic.  In this case, extending a hydraulic fracture deeper into the reservoir will allow higher production rates to be achieved.

Propellant stimulations can be a very economical way to clean up nearbore damage. Propellants are a low-explosive material that generate large amounts of gas downhole very rapidly. The gas pressure builds in the wellbore, increasing tension in the rock until it becomes greater than the breakdown pressure of the formation. Fracture length and fracture pattern are highly dependent on the type of propellant stimulation tool that is used.

Hydraulic fracturing

Lifting the well
Some stimulation techniques do not necessarily mean altering the permeability outside the well bore.  Sometimes they involve making it easier for fluids to flow up the well bore having already entered.  Gas lift is sometimes considered a form of stimulation, particularly when it is only used for starting up the well and shut off during steady state operation.  More commonly though, lifting as a stimulation refers to trying to lift out heavy liquids that have accumulated at the bottom, either through water entry from the formation or through chemicals injected from surface such as scale inhibitors and methanol (hydrate inhibitor).  These liquids sit at the bottom of the well as can act as a weight holding back the flow of reservoir fluids, essentially acting to kill the well.  They can be removed by circulating nitrogen using coiled tubing.

Well stimulation vessels
In more recent times, due to the temporary nature of well stimulation, specialized drilling ships known as "well stimulation vessels" have been used for deep sea well stimulation. Offshore companies such as Norshore and Schlumberger operate a fleet of such specialized ships. Also known as "Multipurpose drilling vessels", these ships replace the conventional drilling oil rig, thus resulting in considerable savings in cost. Some WSV's such as the "Norshore Atlantic" are able to perform multiple tasks including riserless operation in the shallow- and mid-water segments, drilling complete oil wells and performing complete subsea decommissioning (P&A). They are also able to perform pre-drilling of the top hole sections in deep water and well intervention operations with workover risers.

See also
Well intervention
Well kill
Oil reservoir

References

Petroleum production
Oil wells